Pseudolepturges is a genus of beetles in the family Cerambycidae, containing the following species:

 Pseudolepturges caesius Monne & Monne, 2007
 Pseudolepturges rufulus (Bates, 1885)

References

Acanthocinini